The 78th Battalion (Winnipeg Grenadiers), CEF  was an infantry battalion of the Canadian Expeditionary Force during World War I. The 78th Battalion was authorized on 10 July 1915 and embarked for Great Britain on 20 May 1916. It disembarked in France on 13 August 1916, where it fought as part of the 12th Brigade, 4th Canadian Division in France and Flanders until the armistice. The battalion was disbanded on 15 September 1920.

History
The 78th Battalion recruited in Winnipeg, Manitoba and the surrounding area and was mobilized at Winnipeg.

During the attack on Vimy Ridge the 78th was a followup battalion to the 38th, 72nd, and 73rd Battalions and was meant to exploit gains made by their initial attack.  Unfortunately an intact German trench held up the attack and the 78th were hit by a German counterattack.  The battalion lost 75 killed, 261 wounded and 159 missing.

The 78th Battalion had three officers commanding:
Lt.-Col. J. Kirkcaldy, DSO, 22 May 1916 – 15 November 1917
Lt.-Col. J.N. Semmens 16 November 1917 – 19 March 1918
Lt.-Col. J. Kirkcaldy, CMG, DSO, 19 March 1918-Demobilization

 Two members of the 78th Battalion were awarded the Victoria Cross. Lt. James Edward Tait was posthumously awarded the Victoria Cross for his actions on 9 August 1918 during the Battle of Amiens. Lt. Samuel Lewis Honey was posthumously awarded the Victoria Cross for his actions on 27 September 1918 during operations in the vicinity of Bourlon Wood. He had previously been awarded the Distinguished Conduct Medal and the Military Medal.

Battle Honours 
The 78th Battalion was awarded the following battle honours:
SOMME, 1916
Ancre Heights
Ancre, 1916
ARRAS, 1917, '18
Vimy, 1917
Ypres 1917
Passchendaele
AMIENS
Scarpe, 1918
Drocourt-Quéant
HINDENBURG LINE
Canal du Nord
VALENCIENNES
SAMBRE
FRANCE AND FLANDERS, 1916-18

Perpetuation 
The 78th Battalion, CEF is perpetuated by The Winnipeg Grenadiers, currently on the Supplementary Order of Battle.

See also 
 List of infantry battalions in the Canadian Expeditionary Force

References

Sources
 Canadian Expeditionary Force 1914-1919 by Col. G.W.L. Nicholson, CD, Queen's Printer, Ottawa, Ontario, 1962

078
Military units and formations of Manitoba
Winnipeg Grenadiers